The Chrysler Pentastar engine family is a series of aluminium (die-cast cylinder block) dual overhead cam 24-valve gasoline V6 engines introduced for the 2011 model year in Chrysler, Dodge, and Jeep vehicles. The engine was initially named "Phoenix," but the name was changed before the official launch due to a trademark conflict; the Pentastar name is derived from the trademark of the former Chrysler Corporation, which dates back to 1963.

Production
The Pentastar engines are made in three different factories: Dundee Engine Plant, Trenton Engine Plant and Saltillo South Engine Plant.

The Pentastar engine was introduced at the 2009 New York Auto Show. The engine design allows the use of E85 or 87 octane fuel and features dual variable valve timing. Direct injection, forced induction, and cylinder deactivation options were engineered into the engine design, but have not been implemented from the factory, remaining "on the shelf" as of 2016.

Insiders initially reported that the engine would come in four basic sizes (3.0, 3.3, 3.6, and 4.0 L), each offered in various states of tune. The 4.0 L has been dropped from the list and a 3.2 L added, while Fiat's investor website, as of December 2011, specifies the 3.0 L with Fiat's MultiAir technology.

Single and Twin-turbocharged variants had been planned for 2015. Direct injection was also planned.

Due to the new ownership structure, Fiat has obtained the right to use these engines, and had adopted them in the larger models of Lancia and Fiat brands.

First generation

Applications

3.0 L
2014–present Jeep Grand Cherokee (China, Russia)
2014–present Jeep Wrangler (China)
2014-present Chrysler 300C (China)

3.2 L
 2014–2022 Jeep Cherokee

3.6 L
 2011–2014 Chrysler 200 (Models: LX, Touring, Limited, S, and C)
 2011–2016 Chrysler Town & Country (Models: LX, Touring, Touring "L", Limited, S, Limited Platinum)
 2011–2014 Dodge Avenger (Models: SE V6, SXT, R/T)
 2011–present Dodge Challenger (Models: SE, SXT, SXT +, SXT Rallye Edition, GT)
 2011–present Dodge Charger (Models: SE, SXT, SXT +, SXT Rallye Edition, GT)
 2011–present Dodge Durango (Models: Express, SXT, Crew, Crew Lux, Citadel, ACT Plus, Limited, GT)
 2011–2020 Dodge Grand Caravan (Models: SE American Value Package (AVP) or Canadian Value Package (CVP), SE, Crew, Crew Lux, SXT, R/T, SE Plus, SXT Plus, GT)
 2011–2019 Dodge Journey (Models: SE American Value Package (AVP) or Canadian Value Package (CVP), Mainstreet, Crew, Crew Lux, SXT, R/T, GT, Crossroad)
 2011–2015 Jeep Grand Cherokee (Models: Laredo "E", Laredo "X", 70TH Anniversary Edition, Trailhawk, Altitude Edition, Limited, Overland, Overland Summit Edition)
 2011–2014 Volkswagen Routan (Models: S, SE, SEL, SEL Premium)
 2011–present Chrysler 300 (Models: 300 Base, 300 S V6, 300 C w/ V6, 300 C Glacier Series w/ V6, 300 C Luxury Series w/ V6)
 2012–2018 Jeep Wrangler JK (Models: Sport, Unlimited Sport, Sport "S", Unlimited Sport "S", Freedom Edition, Unlimited Freedom Edition, Altitude Edition, Unlimited Altitude Edition, 70TH Anniversary Edition, Unlimited 70TH Anniversary Edition, Sahara, Hard Rock Edition, Unlimited Sahara, Moab, Unlimited Moab, Rubicon, Unlimited Rubicon, Rubicon 10TH Anniversary, Unlimited Rubicon 10TH Anniversary) Jeep Rubicon Recon 2017
 2019-present Jeep Wrangler JL (Models: Sport, Willys Sport, Sport S, Islander, Willys, 80th Anniversary (2021), Freedom, Sport Altitude, Unlimited RHD, Sahara, Rubicon, Sahara Altitude, High Altitude  
 2020-present Jeep Gladiator JT (Models: Sport, Willys Sport (2021), Sport S, Willys (2021), Overland, Freedom, 80th Anniversary (2021), Rubicon, Mojave, High Altitude, California Edition (California dealer only), Texas Trail (Texas dealer only)  
 2011–2015 Ram Cargo Van (Models: C/V Base, C/V Tradesman)
 2012–2015 Lancia Voyager (Models: Limited)
 2012–2014 Lancia Thema
 2012–2015 Fiat Freemont
 2012–present Ram 1500 (Models: Tradesman, SLT, HFE)
 2013–2021 Ram ProMaster
 2014–2017 Chrysler 200 (295-hp, 262-lb ft)
 2016–present Chrysler Pacifica (RU) (287-hp, 262-lb ft) (Hybrid: 260-hp combined, 230-lb ft)
 2020–present Chrysler Voyager (287-hp, 262-lb ft)

Versions

Pentastar upgrade
For 2016, FCA released an updated version of the 3.6 L engine. This engine features upgrades to the variable valve timing (VVT) system, two-stage variable valve lift (VVL), a new intake manifold, new valve springs, new piston rings, new fuel injectors, new ignition coils, a cooled EGR, lower internal friction and lower weight. It also features a higher compression ratio, increased from 10.2:1 to 11.3:1. These improvements increase power as well as efficiency. The new version no longer supports flex-fuel capability.

Applications
 2016-present Jeep Grand Cherokee (295 hp)
 2016-present Dodge Durango (295 hp)
 2016-present Dodge Journey (295 hp)
 2016-present Dodge Grand Caravan
 2017-present Chrysler Pacifica
 2020–present Chrysler Voyager
 2018–present Jeep Wrangler Unlimited JL
 2020–present Jeep Gladiator (JT)
 2022–present Ram Promaster (280 hp)

See also
 List of Chrysler engines

References

External links

 Chrysler press release on 3.6 L Pentastar V6 for the 2011 Jeep Grand Cherokee
 Phoenix engines on Allpar
 Car and Driver details Pentastar upgrade

Pentastar
V6 engines
Gasoline engines by model